CKRK-FM is an English-language Canadian radio station located in the Kahnawake Mohawk Territory, a First Nations reserve near Montreal, Quebec.

It broadcasts on 103.7 MHz with an effective radiated power of 250 watts (class A1) using an omnidirectional antenna. Recent measurements indicate that the transmitter is pushing out 250 watts. The station is heard extremely well in Kahnawake and surrounding towns in the southwest sector of the Montérégie.  Reception is also possible on the island of Montreal, particularly in the south and southwest sectors of the island.

CKRK-FM was originally on 103.5 MHz with only 50 watts; it moved to its current frequency and raised its power in 1996, after another station, CJLM-FM, signed on the same channel in Joliette, causing interference.

The station went on the air on March 30, 1981, and identifies itself as "K1037”. It originally had a country music format; starting in 1995, it moved to an adult contemporary format with significant time devoted to hip-hop programming during weeknights. K1037 still airs country music on the weekend and a recent survey showed that it still leads the way in country music listenership even though another station in Kahnawake plays an all country format.
 
The Kanien'kehaka Onkwawenna Raotitiohkwa Language and Cultural Centre sponsors the station's  1-hour block of programming in Kanien'keha (i.e., "Mohawk language") on Wednesdays between noon and 1 p.m.

The mainstay of K1037’s broadcast week and principal revenue generator is the Friday night "Radio Bingo" broadcast, from 7:30 PM to approximately 10:30 PM.  This on-air bingo game draws in hundreds of players weekly from Kahnawake and the surrounding communities. In the last year (2019-2020) revenue from Commercial Advertising has increased dramatically.

K1037 Radio has carried live play-by-play broadcasts of Kahnawake hockey and lacrosse games throughout the season. Previously, CKRK-FM aired play-by-play broadcasts of Montreal Expos baseball games in 1991 and 1992 on a number of occasions, when CJAD was not able to do so because of scheduling conflicts with Montreal Canadiens hockey games.

In the fall of 2008, K1037, in conjunction with and with the assistance of the Kahnawake Fire Brigade, held a 55-hour-long Radiothon to raise funds towards the purchase of a new ladder truck for the Brigade.  K1037 was successful in raising over $450,000 Canadian towards the $1.1 million price tag for the vehicle.

On April 19, 2010, Montreal radio legend Ted Bird joined the morning show at K1037 after having left CHOM 97-7, his radio home of 25 years, after becoming increasingly disgruntled with the direction of the station. He would leave CKRK-FM on May 7, 2012, over mutual terms that was not revealed. The following week, Bird would return to the air after signing a two-year contract with CKGM.

The station airs country music on weekends, from 6 a.m. Saturday to noon Sunday.

In mid-2019, the Radio Station began playing a mostly Hot AC format with 80s and 90s and its audience began to grow. During the Pandemic of 2020, K1037 peaked at 42,000 listeners per day according to Stats Radio.

The station now averages about 28,000 listeners per day (weekdays) and its longtime weekend country format has almost doubled its listenership since becoming automated in the last year from January 2020 to January 2021. While the 'Country Weekend' has grown it is still far behind CKRK's Weekday audience.

In June of 2022 it was announced that Montreal radio veteran Chris Reiser will join the team as program director.

References

External links
  Official website
 

Krk
Mohawk culture
Radio stations established in 1981
Krk
Krk
Krk
1981 establishments in Quebec